Agron Rufati (born 6 April 1999) is a professional footballer who plays as a centre-back. Born in Croatia, he has represented North Macedonia at youth level.

Career
Born and raised in Zagreb, Croatia, Rufati started playing football at the local Tekstilac Ravnice Zagreb, before moving on to the more renowned HAŠK Zagreb. At the beginning of 2014, he joined the town's top academy, that of GNK Dinamo Zagreb where he would remain until the end of 2016. Following a successful season with NK Lokomotiva in the U19 youth league, Rufati joined NK Istra 1961 on 14 July 2018. Only 2 weeks after joining Istra he already made his professional debut in the opening round of the 2018–19 Croatian First Football League, having played 90 minutes in the 1-1 draw against Slaven Belupo on 29 July 2018.

Honours

Zorya Luhansk
Ukrainian Cup runner-up : 2020-21

References

External links
 

1999 births
Living people
Footballers from Zagreb
Croatian people of Macedonian descent 
Croatian people of Albanian descent
Albanian footballers from North Macedonia
Association football central defenders
Croatian footballers
Macedonian footballers
North Macedonia youth international footballers
North Macedonia under-21 international footballers
NK Istra 1961 players
FC Zorya Luhansk players
LPS HD Clinceni players
Croatian Football League players
Ukrainian Premier League players
Liga I players
Macedonian expatriate footballers
Macedonian expatriate sportspeople in Ukraine
Expatriate footballers in Ukraine
Macedonian expatriate sportspeople in Romania
Expatriate footballers in Romania